

National team

Welsh Cup  

Total Network Solutions beat Carmarthen Town 1–0 in the final of the Welsh Cup.

Welsh League Cup  

Carmarthen Town beat Rhyl 2–0 in the final of the Welsh League Cup.

Welsh Premier League

 Champions: Total Network Solutions 
 Relegated to Welsh Football League Division One: Afan Lido

Welsh Football League Division One 

 Champions: Ton Pentre - did not apply for promotion to Welsh Premier League therefore Cardiff Grange Quins promoted to Welsh Premier League

Cymru Alliance League 

 Champions: Buckley Town - did not apply for promotion to Welsh Premier League

 
Seasons in Welsh football